Sparta Prague is most notably a Czech football club based in Prague (Athletic Club Sparta Praha).

Sparta Prague or Sparta Praha may also refer to:

AC Sparta Prague B, the men's junior football team
AC Sparta Praha (women), a women's football team
AC Sparta Praha (cycling team)
BC Sparta Prague, a men's basketball team
BLC Sparta Prague, a women's basketball team
HC Sparta Prague, an ice hockey team
RC Sparta Prague, a rugby union team

See also
WTA Prague Open, a tennis tournament formerly known as the Sparta Prague open